CIND may refer to

Central Railroad of Indiana
CIND-FM, an FM radio station in Toronto, Ontario, Canada